Denisse Soltero Rodríguez (born 28 June 1989) is a Puerto Rican retired footballer who has played as a forward and a midfielder. She has been a member of the Puerto Rico women's national team.

Early and personal life
Soltero was raised in Mayagüez.

International goals
Scores and results list Puerto Rico's goal tally first.

References

1989 births
Living people
Women's association football forwards
Women's association football midfielders
Puerto Rican women's footballers
People from Mayagüez, Puerto Rico
Puerto Rico women's international footballers
Competitors at the 2010 Central American and Caribbean Games
North Florida Ospreys women's soccer players